In the 1963–64 season, USM Alger is competing in the Championnat National for the 2nd season, as well as the Algerian Cup. They will be competing in Championnat National, and the Algerian Cup.

Squad list
Players and squad numbers last updated on 1 September 1964.Note: Flags indicate national team as has been defined under FIFA eligibility rules. Players may hold more than one non-FIFA nationality.

Pre-season
At the end of the 1963–64 season, USM Alger takes part in a friendly tournament organized by the LOFA at the Oran municipal stadium at the end of June 1964. In addition to the USMA, the clubs invited to this event are the FC Mellila, Raja Casablanca and a mixed team made up of players from the two local clubs, ASM Oran and MC Oran. The Algerians win the tournament by first beating FC Mellila 5–0 in the semi-final, then Raja Casablanca 2–1 in the final.

Competitions

Overview

Division d'Honneur

League table

Algérois

Results by round

Matches

Algerian Cup

Squad information

Playing statistics

Goalscorers
Includes all competitive matches. The list is sorted alphabetically by surname when total goals are equal.

References

USM Alger seasons
Algerian football clubs 1963–64 season